The 2004 Saskatchewan Roughriders finished in 3rd place in the West Division with a 9–9 record. They defeated the Edmonton Eskimos in the West Semi-Final, but lost the West Final to the BC Lions in overtime.

Offseason

CFL draft

Preseason

Regular season

Season standings

Season schedule

Roster

Awards and records
CFL's Most Outstanding Offensive Lineman Award – Gene Makowsky

CFL All-Star Selections
Eddie Davis, Defensive Back
Nate Davis, Defensive Tackle
Andrew Greene, Offensive Guard
Gene Makowsky, Offensive Tackle

Western All-Star Selections
Eddie Davis, Defensive Back
Nate Davis, Defensive Tackle
Andrew Greene, Offensive Guard
Reggie Hunt, Linebacker
Kenton Keith, Running Back
Gene Makowsky, Offensive Tackle

Milestones

Playoffs

West Semi-Final

West Final

References

Saskatchewan Roughriders
Saskatchewan Roughriders seasons